The women's football tournament at the 2012 Summer Olympics was held in London and five other cities in the United Kingdom from 25 July to 9 August. Associations affiliated with FIFA were invited to enter their women's teams in regional qualifying competitions, from which 11 teams, plus the hosts Great Britain reached the final tournament. There are no age restrictions for the players participating in the tournament. It is the first major FIFA affiliated women's tournament to be staged within the United Kingdom, and marked the first time a team representing Great Britain took part in the women's tournament.

Qualifying

Each National Olympic Committee may enter one women's team in the football tournament.

Locations are those of final tournaments, various qualification stages may precede matches at these specific venues.

Venues

The tournament was held in six venues across six cities:
Millennium Stadium, Cardiff
City of Coventry Stadium, Coventry
Hampden Park, Glasgow
Wembley Stadium, London
Old Trafford, Manchester
St James' Park, Newcastle

Draw
The draw for the tournament took place on 24 April 2012. Great Britain, Japan and the United States were seeded for the draw and placed into groups E–G, respectively. The remaining teams were drawn from four pots.

Squads

The women's tournament is a full international tournament with no restrictions on age. Each nation must submit a squad of 18 players.

Match officials
On 19 April 2012, FIFA released the list of match referees that would officiate at the Olympics.

Group stage
Group winners and runners-up and the two best third-ranked teams advanced to the quarter-finals (also see Tie breakers).

All times are British Summer Time (UTC+1).

Group E

Group F

Group G

† Game delayed by one hour, having been originally scheduled at 19:45, due to North Korean protest after accidental use of South Korean flag for North Korea.

Ranking of third-placed teams

Knockout stage

Quarter-finals

Semi-finals

Bronze medal match

Gold medal match

Statistics

Goalscorers

Assists

Discipline
Red cards
 Choe Mi-gyong

Match bans
 Lady Andrade was banned two matches for violent conduct in punching Abby Wambach.

FIFA Fair Play Award
The United States won the FIFA Fair Play Award, given to the team with the best record of fair play during the tournament. Every match in the tournament was taken into account, though only teams that reached the knockout stage were eligible to win the award.

Tournament ranking

Notable events and controversies

North Korea flag confusion
In the first day of the Olympic events on 25 July, the match between DPR Korea and Colombia was delayed by a little over an hour because the flag of South Korea was mistakenly displayed on the electronic scoreboard in Hampden Park. The North Korean team walked off the pitch in protest at seeing the South Korean flag displayed by their names and refused to warm-up whilst the flag was being displayed. They also objected to the South Korean flag being displayed above the stadium, even though the flags of all the competing countries were being displayed. The game then commenced after a delay and rectification of the error.

Andy Mitchell, venue media manager for the London Organising Committee of the Olympic and Paralympic Games (LOCOG), read out a LOCOG statement shortly afterwards:

"Today ahead of the Women’s football match at Hampden Park, the South Korean flag was shown on a big screen video package instead of the North Korean flag. Clearly that is a mistake, we will apologise to the team and the National Olympic Committee and steps will be taken to ensure this does not happen again".

LOCOG's statement had to be reissued because it failed to use the nations' official titles, "Republic of Korea" and "Democratic People's Republic of Korea".

British Prime Minister David Cameron added that it was an "honest mistake" and efforts would be undertaken to ensure such a mishap does not recur. However, North Korean manager Sin Ui-gun expressed reservations about whether the incident was a mistake of intention and said: "We were angry because our players were introduced as if they were from South Korea, which may affect us greatly as you may know. Our team was not going to participate unless the problem was solved perfectly and fortunately some time later, the broadcasting was corrected and shown again live so we made up our mind to participate and go on with the match. If this matter cannot be solved, we thought going on was nonsense. Winning the game cannot compensate for that thing".

Canada–United States semi-final
During the semi-final match between Canada and the United States, a time-wasting call was made against the Canadian goalkeeper, Erin McLeod, when she held the ball longer than the allowed six seconds. As a result, the American side was awarded an indirect free-kick in the box. On the ensuing play, Canada was penalized for a handball in the penalty box, with the American team being awarded a penalty kick, which Abby Wambach converted to tie the game at 3–3. The Americans went on to win the match in extra time, advancing to the gold medal game. After the match, Canada forward Christine Sinclair stated, "the ref decided the result before the game started." FIFA responded by stating that the refereeing decisions were correct and saying it was considering disciplinary action against Sinclair, but that any disciplinary action would be postponed until after the end of the tournament.

See also
 Football at the 2012 Summer Olympics – Men's tournament

References

External links
Official website 
FIFA official website
RSSSF Summary
FIFA Technical Report

 
Women's tournament
2012
Oly
Oly
Oly
Oly
2012
Women's events at the 2012 Summer Olympics